The alii nui of Kauai was the sovereign king or queen of the islands of Kauai and Niihau.

Overview 
The monarchs of Kauai, like those of the other Hawaiian islands, claim descent from Wākea and his wife Papa. Nanaulu, a descendant in the fourteenth generation from Wakea, was the ancestor of Moikeha but his dynasty was supplanted after two generations. The second, or Puna dynasty was established by Laʻa-mai-kahiki, eleventh in descent from Puna-I-Mua who was twenty-fourth in descent from Wakea. Of course, every alii lineage is ancient, but the northern kingdoms produced the great bloodlines that everyone wanted to graft into, including Kamehameha. Theirs is the "bluest blood", and the kingdoms they created, while very much like the kingdoms that Kamehameha's grandparents and parents created, had a slightly different culture. 

The last alii nui of Kauai of the old uninterrupted line of Puna was Kaweloaikanaka. After his overthrow by Kaweloamaihunalii and that monarch's eventual death, the kingdom of Kauai fell to Kualii of Oahu.

In 1810, Kaumualii, negotiated a peaceful end to his power with King Kamehameha I of Hawaii, in an effort to avoid bloodshed. The agreement allowed Kaumualiʻi to remain aliʻi nui until his death, when all lands would revert to Kamehameha's heir. After Kamehameha I's death, King Kamehameha II renegotiated the same deal and took no lands. This outraged Kaʻahumanu who came to the island after KamehamehaII had left and kidnapped Kaumualiʻi, taking him to Honolulu in 1821. After his death in 1824, his son George Kaumualii took back his birth name Humehume and attempted to re-establish an independent on Kauai, but was also eventually captured and taken to Honolulu.

List of alii nui of Kauai
The known independent rulers were:
Moikeha 
Haulanuiaiakea 
La`amaikahiki 
Ahukini-a-La`a, 
Kamahano  
Luanu`u  
Kukona, 1350 - 1380 - sovereign of Kauai when Kalaunuiohua of Hawai`i invaded Kaua`i. Kalaunuiohua made his descent on the coast of Koloa and was met in battle by Kukona's army. Kalaunuiohua's army was defeated and taken prisoner.
Manokalanipō, 1380 - 1410
Kaumaka`amano, 1410 - 1430
Kahaku`a`kane, 1430 - 1460
Kuwalupaukamoku, 1460 - 1480
Kahakumakapaweo, 1480 - 1510
Kalanikukuma, 1510 - 1540
Kahakumakaliua Hakumakaliua, 1540 - 1560
Kamakapu, 1560 - 1580
Kawelo-mahamahaia, 1580 - 1600
Kawelomakualua, 1600 - 1620
Kaweloaikanaka, 1620 - 1650
Kawelo-a-Maihuna-ali`i, usurper (c.1650-1670)
 Kuike-ala-i-keuo'o-o-kalani `Unu-i-akea Ku-ali`i, 1670 - 1730   
Peleʻioholani, 1730 - 1770  
Kamakahelei, (female) 1770 - 1794
Kaumualiʻi 1794 - 1810

See also
Ancient Hawaii
Kingdom of Hawaii
Alii Aimoku of Oahu
Alii Aimoku of Molokai
Alii Aimoku of Maui
Alii Aimoku of Hawaii

References 

 
Lists of people from Hawaii
Hawaiian monarchs
Hawaiiana
Kauai
Native Hawaiian people
People from Hawaii
Polynesian titles
3. ˆKa Makaainana newspaper, June 1, 1896, p. 7.